Siege of Marienburg (or Siege of Malbork) may refer to:

 Siege of Marienburg (1410)
 Siege of Malbork (1454)
 Siege of Marienburg (1457)